Aleksander Mikaelyan (born 9 October 1990) is an Armenian Greco-Roman wrestler.

Mikaelyan was a member of the Armenian Greco-Roman wrestling team at the 2013 Wrestling World Cup. The Armenian team came in fourth place. Mikaelyan personally won a silver medal.

References

1990 births
Living people
Armenian male sport wrestlers
21st-century Armenian people